Salem Township is a township in Daviess County, in the U.S. state of Missouri.

Salem Township was established in 1859.

References

Townships in Missouri
Townships in Daviess County, Missouri